1500 Jyväskylä, provisional designation , is a stony Florian asteroid from the inner regions of the asteroid belt, approximately 7 kilometers in diameter. It was discovered on 16 October 1938, by Finnish astronomer Yrjö Väisälä at the Turku Observatory in Southwest Finland. It was named for the Finnish town Jyväskylä.

Classification and orbit 

Jyväskylä is a member of the Flora family, a large collisional group of stony asteroids. It orbits the Sun in the inner main-belt at a distance of 1.8–2.7 AU once every 3 years and 4 months (1,227 days). Its orbit has an eccentricity of 0.19 and an inclination of 7° with respect to the ecliptic. The body's observation arc begins at Turku, 3 weeks prior to its official discovery observation.

Physical characteristics 

In 2016, a modeled lightcurve was derived from data contained in the Lowell photometric database. Light-curve analysis gave it a rotation period of 8.8275 hours and a spin axis of (123°, −75.0°) in ecliptic coordinates.

According to the survey carried out by NASA's Wide-field Infrared Survey Explorer with its subsequent NEOWISE mission, the asteroid measures between 7.39 and 8.095 kilometers in diameter, and its surface has an albedo between 0.161 and 0.31. The Collaborative Asteroid Lightcurve Link assumes an albedo of 0.24 – derived from 8 Flora, the largest member and namesake of this family – and calculates a diameter of 6.63 kilometers, using an absolute magnitude of 13.06.

Naming 

This minor planet was named for the Finnish town Jyväskylä. It is the largest city in the region of Central Finland and on the Finnish Lakeland. The official  was published by the Minor Planet Center on 20 February 1976.

References

External links 
 Asteroid Lightcurve Database (LCDB), query form (info )
 Dictionary of Minor Planet Names, Google books
 Asteroids and comets rotation curves, CdR – Observatoire de Genève, Raoul Behrend
 Discovery Circumstances: Numbered Minor Planets (1)-(5000)  – Minor Planet Center
 
 

001500
Discoveries by Yrjö Väisälä
Named minor planets
001500
19381016